WVNP is a public radio formatted broadcast radio station licensed to Wheeling, West Virginia, United States, serving the Northern Panhandle of West Virginia and the Upper Ohio River Valley.  WVNP is owned and operated by West Virginia Educational Broadcasting Authority.

Booster station
In addition to the main station, WVNP is relayed by an FM booster station to widen its broadcast area.  The booster is owned and operated by West Virginia Educational Broadcasting Authority.

References

External links
West Virginia Public Broadcasting Online

NPR member stations
VDM